Conrad is a Germanic masculine given name and a surname.

Origin and meaning
It is derived from the Proto-Germanic name Konrad, from conja meaning "bold" and rad "counsel". It was the name of a 10th-century bishop of Constance, and became popular in post-medieval English and post-medieval French. It regained popularity in the English-speaking world in the 19th century. It is recorded as a surname as early as 1297.

There are over one hundred forms and spelling variants of the surname, including:
German:  Konrad, Kohrt, Kordt, Kunrad, Kuhndert, Kuhnt, and Kurth
Dutch: Coen, Coenraad, Koen(raad), Koendert, Koene
Afrikaans: Conradie 
Swedish: Konrad
Icelandic : Konráður
Irish: Ó Conradh (In Irish, the word conradh also means "league" or "alliance")
Latvia: Konrāds
Polish: Konrad
Czech and Slovak: Konrád
Italian: Corrado
Hungarian: Konrád
Spanish and Portuguese: Conrado
Diminutives:  Kienzle, Kuhn, Kunc, Kunz, Kuntz, Kunzel, Zunzelman
Patronymics: Kurten, Coners, Conerding, Conradsen, Coenraets, Kondratowicz, Konradowicz, Kondratowitz

People

First name
Conrad, prior of Christ Church at Canterbury from 1108 to 1126
Conrad Aiken (1889–1973), American writer
Conrad Anker (born 1962), American mountaineer
Conrad Bain (1923–2013), Canadian-born American actor
Conrad Bassett-Bouchard (born 1989), American scrabble player
Conrad Black (born 1944), British newspaper publisher and writer
Conrad Buff (born 1948), American film editor
Conrad Burns (born 1935), American politician
Conrad Coleby (born 1979), Australian actor
Conrad K. Cyr (born 1931), American judge
Conrad Dobler (born 1950), American football player
Conrad Felixmüller (1897–1977), German painter and printmaker
Conrad of Gelnhausen (1320–1390), German theologian
Conrad Gessner (1516–1565), Swiss naturalist and bibliographer
Conrad Hall (1926–2003), American cinematographer
Conrad Hilton (1887–1979), American hotelier
Conrad Hilton Jr. (1926–1969), American socialite
Conrad Hubbard, American game designer and writer
Conrad Janis (1928-2022), American jazz musician and actor
Conrad N. Jordan (1830–1903), American banker
Conrad Keely (born 1972), American singer
Conrad Knowles (1810–1844), Australian actor
Conrad Leinemann (born 1971), Canadian beach volleyball player
Conrad of Lichtenberg (1240–1299), German bishop
Conrad Longmire (1921–2010), American theoretical physicist
Conrad Malte-Brun (1755–1826), Danish-born French geographer
Conrad Marais (born 1989), Namibian rugby union player
Conrad Murray (born 1953), Grenadian physician, convicted of the manslaughter of Michael Jackson
Conrad Nagel (1897–1970), American actor
Conrad Nightingale (born 1945), American steeplechase runner
Conrad Phillips (1925–2016), British actor
Conrad Ricamora, American actor and singer
Conrad Richter (1890–1968), American novelist
Conrad Ross, Uruguayan footballer and manager
Conrad Roy (1995–2014), American marine salvage captain whose suicide resulted in a manslaughter conviction of his girlfriend
Conrad Sewell (born 1988), Australian singer
Conrad Smith (born 1981), New Zealand rugby player
Conrad Stoltz (born 1973), South African triathlete
Conrad Tillard (born 1964), American politician, Baptist minister, radio host, author, and activist
Conrad Veidt (1893–1943), German actor
Conrad Michelo Chisumpa (born 1998), Zambian Young Entrepreneur and Aviation enthusiast.

Surname

Royalty
Conrad I of Germany (890–918)
Conrad the Red (922–955)
Conrad II, Holy Roman Emperor (990–1039)
Conrad III of Germany (1093–1152)
Conrad IV of Germany (1228–1254)
Conrad V of Germany (1252–1268)
Conrad I, Duke of Bavaria (1020–1055)
Conrad II, Duke of Bavaria (1052–1055)
Conrad of Burgundy (925–993)
Conrad I, Duke of Carinthia (975–1011)
Conrad II, Duke of Carinthia (1003–1039)
Conrad I, Count of Luxembourg (1040–1086)
Conrad II, Count of Luxembourg (died 1136)
Conrad II of Italy (1074–1101)
Conrad of Montferrat (1140s–1192)
Conrad I, Burgrave of Nuremberg (1186–1261)
Conrad I, Duke of Swabia (died 997)
Conrad II, Duke of Swabia (1173–1196)

Saints
Saint Conrad of Constance (900–975)
Saint Conrad of Parzham (1818–1894)
Saint Conrad of Piacenza (1290–1351)
Blessed Conrad of Offida (1241–1306)
Blessed Conrad of Mondsee (died 1145)
Blessed Conrad of Ottobeuren (died 1227)

Fiction
Conrad the Cat, Warner Bros. cartoon character
Conrad Birdie, teenage heartthrob in Bye Bye Birdie (musical)
Adrian Conrad, character in the television series Stargate SG-1
Hermes Conrad, character of the television series Futurama
Conrad Dalton, character on television series Madam Secretary
Conrad Oxford, character in the movie The King's Man
Conrad Ecklie, fictional character in the television series CSI: Crime Scene Investigation
Conrad Grayson, fictional character in the television series Revenge
Conrad S. "Duke" Hauser, fictional First Sergeant of G.I. Joe, elite anti-terrorism task force
Conrad Hawkins, character on television series The Resident
Conrad McMasters, character on the television series Matlock
Conrad Shepard, character in the Seasons 1–3 of television series Weeds
Corrado John "Junior" Soprano Jr., fictional character on the television series The Sopranos
Conrad Stargard, fictional character in a series of novels by Leo Frankowski
Conrad Walden, character in the film The Cat in the Hat
Conrad Weller, fictional character in the Kyo Kara Maoh! series of novels by Tomo Takabayashi

See also
Conrad (disambiguation)
 Conradus (disambiguation)
Konrad, surname
Konrad (given name)
Coenraad

References

Masculine given names
German masculine given names
English masculine given names
Surnames from given names